is one of the 18 wards of the city of Yokohama in Kanagawa Prefecture, Japan. As of 2010, the ward had an estimated population of 273,418 and a density of 7,640 persons per km2. The total area was 35.70  km2.

Geography
Totsuka Ward is located in eastern Kanagawa Prefecture, and in the center-western area of the city of Yokohama. The area is largely flatland, with scattered small hills. The Kashio River passes through the Ward.

Surrounding municipalities
Sakae Ward
Hodagaya Ward
Minami Ward
Asahi Ward
Kōnan Ward
Izumi Ward
Kamakura
Fujisawa

History
The area around present-day Totsuka Ward has been inhabited for thousands of years. Archaeologists have found ceramic shards from the Jōmon period at numerous locations in the area. There are numerous keyhole tombs from the Kofun period in Totsuka, including one on the grounds of Tomizuka Hachiman Shrine, from which the ward's name is derived. Under the Nara period Ritsuryō system, it became part of Kamakura District and Kōza District in Sagami Province. By the Heian period it was part of a shōen controlled by the Sudō clan, but came under the control of the Kamakura clan (of which Kamakura Gongorō Kagemasa was the most illustrious member) by the start of the Kamakura period. During the Kamakura period, it was largely farmland, supporting the population of nearby Kamakura; however by the Muromachi period it had become a contested territory divided between the Hatakeyama clan, Miura clan, Oba clan, and others until their territories were seized by the Later Hōjō clan from Odawara in the late Sengoku period. After the defeat of the Hōjō at the Battle of Odawara, the territory came under the control of Tokugawa Ieyasu. It was administered as tenryō territory controlled directly by the Tokugawa shogunate, but administered through various hatamoto. The area prospered in the Edo period as Totsuka-juku, a post station on the Tōkaidō connecting Edo with Kyoto.

After the Meiji Restoration, the area was transferred to the new Kanagawa Prefecture, with Totsuka-shuku becoming the capital of the Kamakura District. In the cadastral reform of April 1, 1889, Totsuka Town was established; two years after the completion of Totsuka Station on the Tōkaidō Main Line railway connecting Tokyo with Osaka. During the Meiji period the area prospered as a center of meat production to supply the foreign population of nearby Yokohama. In April 1939, Totsuka and neighboring villages were annexed by the neighboring city of Yokohama, becoming Totsuka Ward. In 1944, the Imperial Japanese Navy established a medical school and large scale hospital facilities in Totsuka. In 1966, Seya Ward was separated from Totsuka. In a major administrative reorganization of 1986, Izumi Ward and Sakae Ward were also separated from Totsuka.

Economy

Totsuka Ward is largely a regional commercial center and bedroom community for central Yokohama and Tokyo. Totsuka retains a relatively strong industrial base. In 2010, 160 factories in the ward employed 12,010 employees and their shipment amounted to 399 billion yen.
There are major factories operated by KI Holdings, Hitachi Ltd., Nissin Foods, Yamazaki Baking Company Limited, Pola Cosmetics, and others.

Transportation

Railroads
JR East - Tōkaidō Main Line
 
JR East - Yokosuka Line – Shōnan-Shinjuku Line
  – 
Yokohama City Transportation Bureau – Blue Line
  -

Bus 
Kanagawa Chuo Kotsu / Yokohama Kanako Bus / Fujisawa Kanako Bus
Maioka Garage
Yokohama Municipal Bus
Sagami Railway Bus
Enoden Bus

Highways

National Highways
Yokohama Shindō (a bypass route of Route 1)
Route 1

Prefecture roads
Kanagawa Prefectural Route 23
Kanagawa Prefectural Route 203
Kanagawa Prefectural Route 218
Kanagawa Prefectural Route 401
Kanagawa Prefectural Route 402
Kanagawa Prefectural Route 403

City roads
Main Local Road No. 17 Loop Line 2
Loop Line 3
Main Local Road No. 18 Loop Line 4
Totsuka-Ōfuna Line
Maioka-Kamigō Line

Education
Colleges and Universities:
Meiji Gakuin University
Yokohama College of Pharmacy
Kihara Institute for Biological Research (Yokohama City University)
Shōnan University of Medical Sciences

Kanagawa Prefectural Board of Education operates prefectural senior high schools:

 operates the following municipal high school:
 

Private secondary school:

The municipal board of education operates municipal elementary schools and junior high schools.

Junior high schools:

Akiba (秋葉)
Fukaya (深谷)
Gumisawa (汲沢)
Hirado (平戸)
Maioka (舞岡)
Minami-totsuka (南戸塚)
Nase (名瀬)
Sakaigi (境木)
Taishō (大正)
Totsuka (戸塚)
Toyoda (豊田)

Additionally, Ryokuen Gakuen (緑園学園), a combined elementary and junior high school outside of Totsuka-ku, has an attendance zone including parts of Totsuka-ku.

Elementary schools:

Akiba (秋葉)
Fukaya (深谷)
Gumisawa (汲沢)
Higashi-gumisawa (東汲沢)
Higashi-matano (東俣野)
Higashi-shinano (東品濃)
Higashi-totsuka (東戸塚)
Hirado (平戸)
Hiradodai (平戸台)
Kamiyabe (上矢部)
Kashio (柏尾)
Kawakami (川上)
Kawakami-kita (川上北)
Kosuzume (小雀)
Kurata (倉田)
Maioka (舞岡)
Minami-maioka (南舞岡)
Minami-totsuka (南戸塚)
Nase (名瀬)
Sakaigi (境木)
Shimogō (下郷)
Shinano (品濃)
Taishō (大正)
Torigaoka (鳥が丘)
Totsuka (戸塚)
Yabe (矢部)
Yokohama Fukayadai (横浜深谷台)

Former elementary schools:
Matano (俣野) - Merged into Fukayadai Elementary (深谷台小学校) in 2017 to form Yokohama Fukayadai Elementary.

Additionally, Kosugaya Elementary School (小菅ケ谷小学校), Kuzuno Elementary School (葛野小学校), Mutsukawa Nishi Elementary School (六つ川西小学校), and Toyoda Elementary School (豊田小学校), outside of Totsuka-ku, have attendance zones including parts of Totsuka-ku.

Noted people from Totsuka
Tomoyoshi Ono, professional soccer player
Shunsuke Nakamura, professional soccer player
Takeshi Mizuuchi, professional soccer player
Wataru Endo, professional football player 
Ken Takahashi, professional baseball player
Naomi Hosokawa, actress
Shin'ichiro Sakurai, engineer and car designer

References

 Kato, Yuzo. Yokohama Past and Present. Yokohama City University (1990).

External links
Ward Office
City of Yokohama statistics

Wards of Yokohama